Addison Richards (born September 28, 1993) is a Canadian former football wide receiver who played for the Winnipeg Blue Bombers of the Canadian Football League (CFL).  Richards was drafted 11th overall by the Winnipeg Blue Bombers in the 2015 CFL Draft. Richards played CIS football with the Regina Rams.

References

1993 births
Living people
Sportspeople from Regina, Saskatchewan
Players of Canadian football from Saskatchewan
Regina Rams players
Canadian football wide receivers
Winnipeg Blue Bombers players